Ekaterina Alexandrovna Smirnova (born 8 September 1988) is a female sprinter from Russia. She competed in the Women's 200 metres event at the 2015 World Championships in Athletics in Beijing, China.

Married to the participant of the Olympic Games, Russian sprinter Roman Smirnov.

See also
 Russia at the 2015 World Championships in Athletics

References

External links
 

1988 births
Living people
Sportspeople from Kaluga
Russian female sprinters
World Athletics Championships athletes for Russia